Tha Muang is a district (amphoe) in the southern part of Kanchanaburi province, central Thailand.

History
The district was established in 1898. Later people in the district moved southward to nearby Wat Si Loha Rat Bamrung. They changed the district name to Wang Khanai (วังขนาย). In 1939 Phra Woraphak Phibun, then head of the district, renamed the district Tha Muang after the name of the central tambon.

Geography
Neighbouring districts are (from the north clockwise) Dan Makham Tia, Mueang Kanchanaburi, Bo Phloi, Phanom Thuan, Tha Maka of Kanchanaburi Province, Ban Pong, and Chom Bueng of Ratchaburi province.

The important water resource is the Mae Klong River. The Mae Klong Dam on the Mae Klong River is in the district.

Administration
The district is divided into 13 sub-districts (tambons), which are further subdivided into 113 villages (mubans). There are five townships (thesaban tambons) within the district: Tha Muang, Nong Khao, and Nong Takya each cover parts of the same-named tambon, while Samrong covers parts of tambon Phang Tru and the tambon Wang Sala. Also parts of tambon Tha Lo belong to the town Kanchanaburi. There are another 12 tambon administrative organizations (TAO).

References

External links
amphoe.com

Tha Muang